Robert Thomas Jauron (May 8, 1919 – July 20, 2010) was an American football player and coach.

A native of Nashua, New Hampshire, Jauron attended Nashua High School where he was a three-sport star in football, baseball, and track. After graduating from high school in 1938, he played college football (as a halfback) and baseball at Boston College.

Jauron began his coaching career as a high school coach, compiling a 73–14–1 record. He next served as the head football coach at St. Joseph's College in Rensselaer, Indiana, from 1954 to 1958. He compiled a 32–13–1 record in five years at Saint Joseph's and left the position in the spring of 1959.

After leaving Saint Joseph's, Jauron coached for a year for the Kitchener Dutchmen of the Canadian League. In 1960, he returned to high school as the head coach at Memorial High School in Manchester, New Hampshire. After one year in Manchester, he accepted a high school coaching position in Lynn, Massachusetts. In March 1967, he was hired as an offensive coach at Xavier University in Cincinnati. He also served as the head football coach at Brandeis University from 1971 to 1972.

Jauron was the father of National Football League coach Dick Jauron.

Head coaching record

Varsity college

References

External links
 

1919 births
2010 deaths
American football halfbacks
Boston College Eagles baseball players
Boston College Eagles football players
Brandeis Judges football coaches
Holy Cross Crusaders football coaches
Saint Joseph's Pumas football coaches
Xavier Musketeers football coaches
High school football coaches in Illinois
High school football coaches in Massachusetts
High school football coaches in Montana
High school football coaches in New Hampshire
High school football coaches in Ohio
Sportspeople from Nashua, New Hampshire
Coaches of American football from New Hampshire
Players of American football from New Hampshire
Baseball players from New Hampshire